This is a list of women writers who were born in Lebanon or whose writings are closely associated with that country.

A
Etel Adnan (1925–2021), Lebanese-American poet, essayist, artist, writing in English, French and Arabic
Ezza Agha Malak (born 1942), acclaimed French-language novelist, poet
Suzanne Alaywan (born 1974), poet, artist

B
Sahar Baassiri, since 1981: journalist, non-fiction writer
Layla Balabakki (born 1936), novelist, journalist, feminist
Hoda Barakat (born 1952), widely translated Arabic-language novelist, author of The Stone of Laughter
Najwa Barakat (born 1966), novelist

C
Tracy Chamoun (born 1962), politician, non-fiction writer, memoirist
Youmna Chlala, writer, artist
Amal Clooney (born 1978), Lebanese-born British lawyer, non-fiction writer

D
Raghida Dergham (born 1953), Lebanese-American journalist

F
Emily Fares Ibrahim (born 1914), Lebanese-American writer, poet and feminist
Zaynab Fawwaz (1860–1914), poet, novelist, journalist, biographer

H
Joumana Haddad (born 1970), widely translated Arabic-language poet, translator, journalist, women's rights activist
Nimat Hamoush, novelist, short story writer
Renée Hayek, contemporary novelist, short story writer

J
Inaya Jaber (1958–2021), poet, short story writer, journalist, artist and singer
Nada Awar Jarrar, since 2003: novelist, author of Somewhere, home

K
Anbara Salam Khalidy (1897–1986), feminist, memoirist, translator
Tara Khattar (born 1993), chef and food writer
Vénus Khoury-Ghata (born 1937), novelist, poet

M
Rima Maktabi (born 1977), journalist, television reporter
Jacqueline Massabki (died 2015), novelist and lawyer
Fatin al-Murr (born 1969), Arabic-language short story writer, novelist
Diane Mazloum (born 1980), French-Lebanese writer

N
Layal Najib (c.1983–2006), photojournalist, killed during the 2006 Lebanon War
Emily Nasrallah (1931–2018), novelist, journalist, short story writer, women's rights activist
Octavia Nasr (born 1966), journalist, CNN reporter

Q
Najwa Qassem (1967–2020), contemporary journalist, television reporter since 1993

R 

 Salima Abi Rashed (1887–1919), journalist

S
Dalal Khalil Safadi (1898–1876), short story writer, translator
Widad Sakakini (1913–1991), short story writer, novelist, critic
Afifa Al Shartouni (1886–1906) writer, poet
Hanan al-Shaykh (born 1945), journalist, novelist, author of Women of Sand and Myrrh
Alawiya Sobh (born 1955), novelist, magazine editor
Nazik Saba Yared (born 1928), novelist, academic
Nur Salman (born 1937), writer

T
Sahar Taha (born 1963), musician, singer, journalist
Nadia Tueni (1935–1983), French-language poet

U 

 Layla ʽUssayran (1934–2007), novelist

Z
Maya Zankoul (born 1986), artist, cartoonist, best selling novelist
May Ziadeh (1886–1941), prolific poet, essayist, columnist, translator

See also
List of women writers

References

-
Lebanese
Writers
Writers, women